Richard D. Robinson is an Associate Professor of Materials Science and Engineering at Cornell University.

Education
Robinson grew up in Indianapolis and discovered science and engineering through a National Science Foundation program in eighth grade.
Robinson obtained his BS and MS in mechanical engineering at Tufts University and his PhD in Applied Physics 2004 at Columbia University.

Academic career
Richard Robinson joined Lawrence Berkeley National Laboratory and University of California, Berkeley as a Lawrence Chemist Postdoctoral Fellow in Chemistry and Materials Science in the group of Paul Alivisatos, 2004-2008. In July 2008, he joined the Department of Materials Science and Engineering at Cornell University as an assistant professor.
In 2016, Robinson spent time at the Institute of Chemistry at Hebrew University on a Fulbright Scholarship.

Research
Robinson works on size-, shape-, composition-, and surface-controlled nanoparticle synthesis, and nanoparticle assembly, and nanoparticle assembly for electronic and catalytic applications.
Robinson's work was featured in the Cornell Chronicle, Physics Today, and R&D. In addition, Robinson has received many awards and distinctions for his research, such as the National Science Foundation Early Career Development Award, Fulbright Scholar, and the R&D 100 Award for his work on nanocrystal solar cells.

According to Scopus, his publications have received 5404 citations, and his h-index is 26.

Honors and awards
Robinson received an NSF CAREER Award from the National Science Foundation and a 3M Non-Tenured Faculty Award in 2012.

References

External links
 
 
 

Living people
African-American engineers
Cornell University faculty
Columbia University alumni
Tufts University School of Engineering alumni
21st-century American engineers
Year of birth missing (living people)
21st-century African-American people